A spherical plain bearing is a bearing that permits angular rotation about a central point in two orthogonal directions (usually within a specified angular limit based on the bearing geometry). Typically these bearings support a rotating shaft in the bore of the inner ring that must move not only rotationally, but also at an angle. 

Self-aligning spherical bearings were first used by James Nasmyth around 1840 to support line shaft bearings in mills and machine shops. For long shafts it was impossible to accurately align bearings, even if the shaft was perfectly straight. Nasmyth used brass bearing shells between hemispherical brass cups to align the bearings to self-align.

Construction
Spherical bearings can be of a hydrostatic or mechanical construction. A spherical bearing by itself consists of an outer ring and an inner ring and a locking feature that makes the inner ring captive within the outer ring in the axial direction only. The outer surface of the inner ring and the inner surface of the outer ring are spherical and are collectively considered the raceway and they slide against each other, either with a lubricant, a maintenance-free (typically polytetrafluoroethylene or PTFE) based liner, or they incorporate a rolling element such as a race of ball-bearings, allowing lower friction.

Application
Spherical bearings are used in countless applications, wherever rotational motion must be allowed to change the alignment of its rotation axis. A good example is the drive axle bearings of a vehicle control arm (or A-arm) suspension. The mechanics of the suspension allow the axle to move up and down (and the wheel to turn in order to steer the vehicle), and the axle bearings must allow the rotational axis of the axle to change without binding. While in practice, spherical bearings are rarely used here, it is a simple concept that illustrates a possible application of a spherical bearing. In fact, spherical bearings are used in smaller sub-components of this type of suspension, for example certain types of constant-velocity joints. 

Spherical bearings are used in car suspensions, engines, driveshafts, heavy machinery, sewing machines, robotics and many other applications.

See also
  
 
 
 
  – one of the earliest patented applications of this technology

References

External links
 Spherical bearing 101 With single and double rows of rollers.

Bearings (mechanical)